Neil Arthur Levine (born 1941) is an American art historian and educator, who is a specialist on Frank Lloyd Wright.

Career
Levine graduated with a Bachelor of Arts from Princeton University in 1963, and wrote a senior thesis on Beaux-Arts architecture in the United States, supervised by Robert Rosenblum. Levine then received a Master of Arts, studying Frank Heyling Furness, and a Doctor of Philosophy in Art History from Yale University in 1975. His dissertation was on the architect Henri Labrouste and the Sainte-Geneviève Library, supervised by Vincent Scully.

In 1975, Levine began serving as Emmet Blakeney Gleason Professor of the History of Art and Architecture at Harvard University. During the 1994-1995 academic year, he was named Slade Professor of Fine Art at the University of Cambridge. 

In 2003, Levine was awarded a Guggenheim Fellowship. Seven years later, Levine was elected as Fellow of the American Academy of Arts and Sciences. In that same year, Levine's lectures from the University of Cambridge were the basis of his book titled Modern Architecture: Representation and Reality, published by Yale University Press.

In 2014, Levine retired from teaching at Harvard. Two years later, Levine donated his collection of architectural drawings, over three hundred in total, by artists such as Félix Duban and Jacques Ignace Hittorff to the Musée d'Orsay in Paris.

Selected works
The Architecture of Frank Lloyd Wright, 1996  
Modern Architecture: Representation and Reality, 2010 
The Urbanism of Frank Lloyd Wright, 2015

See also
List of American Academy of Arts and Sciences members (2006–2019)
List of Guggenheim Fellowships awarded in 2003
List of Princeton University people
List of Yale University people

References

External links
Harvard University profile

1941 births
Living people
Princeton University alumni
Yale University alumni
American art historians
American architectural historians
Harvard University faculty
Slade Professors of Fine Art (University of Cambridge)
Fellows of the American Academy of Arts and Sciences